Banco di Sicilia was an Italian bank based in Palermo, Sicily. It was a subsidiary of UniCredit but absorbed into the parent company in 2010.

History

It was founded as Banco Regio dei Reali Domini al di là del Faro in 1849 and was renamed in 1860. From 1867 to 1926 the Banco di Sicilia was granted permission to issue legal tender currency (along with Bank of Italy and Banco di Napoli).

As a public institution it was among the largest banks in Italy, with foreign branches and subsidiaries in the United States (Trust Company Bank of Sicily), Libya (Sahara Bank), United Kingdom, Germany, Denmark, France and UAE.

In 1997 it acquired Sicilcassa, at the same time the capital increase of Banco di Sicilia was subscribed by Mediocredito Centrale.

In 1999 Mediocredito Centrale Group was acquired by Banca di Roma. Banco di Sicilia became a subsidiary of the group. According to the Bank of Italy, Banco di Sicilia had market shares of 34% at that time in the island, in terms of branches. The sum of the branches of the second to sixth largest banking group in the island was still lower than 34%. (Banca Popolare di Lodi, Banca Antonveneta, Banca Commerciale Italiana, Banca Monte dei Paschi di Siena and Banca Popolare Sant'Angelo)

In 2002 Banco di Roma merged with Bipop Carire to form Capitalia. In 2007 Capitalia was acquired by UniCredit, which Banco di Sicilia became its subsidiary instead.

In 2008, 20 branches of the bank were sold to Banca Carige.

In 2010, UniCredit Banca, Banco di Sicilia and Banca di Roma were absorbed into the parent company UniCredit.

As at 31 December 2009, Banco di Sicilia had a total assets of €14,921,651,349 and a shareholders' equity of €422,168,345.

See also

 Banca Agricola Popolare di Ragusa, an Italian bank
 Banca Nuova, a subsidiary of Banca Popolare di Vicenza
 Banco Popolare Siciliano
 Credito Siciliano, a subsidiary of Credito Valtellinese

Bibliography

References

External links
 Fondazione Banco di Sicilia 
 Entry in bankpedia 

Banks established in 1850
Italian companies established in 1850
Banks disestablished in 2010
Italian companies disestablished in 2010
Defunct banks of Italy
Companies based in Palermo
Former UniCredit subsidiaries